The men's 400 metres event at the 1998 Commonwealth Games was held 16–18 September on National Stadium, Bukit Jalil.

Medalists

Results

Heats
Qualification: First 4 of each heat (Q) and the next 8 fastest (q) qualified for the quarterfinals.

Quarterfinals
Qualification: First 4 of each heat qualified directly (Q) for the semifinals.

Semifinals
Qualification: First 4 of each heat qualified directly (Q) for the final.

Final

References

Athletics at the 1998 Commonwealth Games
1998